The Widow Maloby's Tavern is a historic tavern building located in the Queen Village neighborhood of Philadelphia, Pennsylvania. The tavern was built in 1764, and is a 3 1/2-story, three bay by two bay, brick rowhouse. It was originally painted yellow.  It remained a tavern and community gathering place for over a century.

It was added to the National Register of Historic Places on March 16, 1972. The tavern is also part of the South Front Street Historic District.

Gallery

References

External links
 Thomas Maloby House & Tavern, 700 South Front Street, Philadelphia, Philadelphia County, PA: 1 photo and 1 photo caption page at Historic American Buildings Survey
 600-858 South Front Street (Houses), West side Front Street between South & Catharine Streets, Philadelphia, Philadelphia County, PA: 4 photos and 1 photo caption page at Historic American Buildings Survey

Commercial buildings on the National Register of Historic Places in Philadelphia
Commercial buildings completed in 1764
South Philadelphia
1764 establishments in Pennsylvania